Jim Grabb and Richey Reneberg were the defending champions, but did not participate together this year.  Grabb partnered Wayne Black, losing in the first round.  Reneberg partnered Sjeng Schalken, losing in the first round.

Ellis Ferreira and Patrick Galbraith won in the final 3–6, 6–2, 6–4, against Olivier Delaître and Fabrice Santoro.

Seeds

  Ellis Ferreira /  Patrick Galbraith (champions)
  Mark Knowles /  Daniel Nestor (quarterfinals)
  Neil Broad /  Piet Norval (quarterfinals)
  Wayne Black /  Jim Grabb (first round)

Draw

Draw

External links
Main Draw

1997 ATP Tour